The following are the Pulitzer Prizes for 1928.

Journalism awards
Public Service:
Indianapolis Times, for its work in exposing political corruption to Indiana, prosecuting the guilty and bringing about a more wholesome state of affairs in civil government.
Reporting:
No award given
Editorial Writing:
Grover Cleveland Hall of The Montgomery Advertiser, for his editorials against gangsterism, floggings and racial and religious intolerance. "The Advertiser waged war against the resurgent Ku Klux Klan", the paper says today.

Editorial Cartooning:
Nelson Harding of the Brooklyn Daily Eagle, "May His Shadow Never Grow Less."

Letters and Drama Awards
Novel:
The Bridge of San Luis Rey by Thornton Wilder (Boni)
Drama:
Strange Interlude by Eugene O'Neill (Boni)
History:
Main Currents in American Thought, 2 vols. by Vernon Louis Parrington (Harcourt)
Biography or Autobiography:
The American Orchestra and Theodore Thomas by Charles Edward Russell (Doubleday)
Poetry:
Tristram by Edwin Arlington Robinson (Macmillan)

References

External links
Pulitzer Prizes for 1928

Pulitzer Prizes by year
Pulitzer Prize
Pulitzer Prize